Hawke's Bay is a town at the mouth of Torrent River southeast of Point Riche in the Canadian province of Newfoundland and Labrador.

History 
The town was named after Edward Hawke by James Cook in 1766.  This was to commemorate Hawke's victory in the Battle of Quiberon Bay in 1759.  Although Hawke's Bay was used as an enclave during the early struggle for North America by both the English and French navies, it was not until the early 20th century that Michael Walsh became the first permanent settler.  In 1903, a whaling station was established on the north side of the bay, but it closed the following year.  Sydney Cotton ran the first airmail service in Newfoundland to Hawke's Bay.  In 1933, pulpwood harvesting was established in the area by the International Pulp and Paper Company.

The first Postmistress was Miss Dorothea Desse Hoddinott who died in August 2003.

Climate 
Hawke's Bay has a humid continental climate (Koppen: Dfb). Summers are mild and rainy while winters are chilly and extremely snowy, with average annual snowfall totaling 360.5 cm (142 inches) . Winter typically begins during November and can last well into April, and can see nightly lows dip well below zero.

Demographics 

See also
 List of communities in Newfoundland and Labrador

References 

Populated coastal places in Canada
Towns in Newfoundland and Labrador
Fishing communities in Canada